"I Just Called to Say I Love You" is a ballad written, produced, and performed by American R&B singer and songwriter Stevie Wonder. It was a major international hit, and remains Wonder's best-selling single to date, having topped a record 19 charts.

The song was the lead single from the 1984 soundtrack album The Woman in Red, along with two other songs by Wonder, and scored number one on the Billboard Hot 100 for three weeks from October 13 to October 27, 1984. It also became his tenth number-one on the R&B chart, and his fourth on the adult contemporary chart; it spent three weeks at the top of both charts, and for the same weeks as on the Hot 100. The song also became Wonder's only solo UK number-one success, staying at the top for six weeks, in the process also becoming Motown Records' biggest-selling single in the UK, a distinction it still held . In addition, the song won both a Golden Globe and an Academy Award for Best Original Song. The song also received three nominations at the 27th Grammy Awards for Best Male Pop Vocal Performance, Song of the Year, and Best Pop Instrumental Performance.

The song's lyrics have Wonder surprising his love interest with an unexpected telephone call. Throughout the song, Wonder lists events in a yearly calendar that might prompt someone to call a loved one. Yet he explains no special annual event such as New Year's Day or Halloween spurred the call. He simply wants to tell her he loves her from the bottom of his heart.  Cash Box described the song as "a tender and romantic love letter which captures the ever-present and Wonderous feeling of love and optimism."

There was a dispute among Wonder, his former writing partner Lee Garrett, and Lloyd Chiate as to who actually wrote the song. Chiate claimed in a lawsuit that he and Garrett wrote the song years before its 1984 release. However, a jury ultimately sided with Wonder.

Personnel

Stevie Wonder – lead and backing vocals, synthesizers, programming, Roland VP-330, Linn 9000, and Oberheim DMX

Music video
A music video of the song has Wonder, during a concert, singing into a telephone receiver while seated at a piano.  By the end of the song, he and the audience are standing and swaying to the music.  The video features concert footage recorded in Rotterdam Ahoy, in the Netherlands, on August 10, 1984.

Charts

Weekly charts

Year-end charts

Decade-end charts

All-time charts

Sales and certifications

See also

List of number-one singles in Australia during the 1980s
List of RPM number-one singles of 1984
List of European number-one hits of 1984
List of number-one hits of 1984 (France)
List of number-one hits of 1984 (Germany)
List of number-one singles of 1984 (Ireland)
List of Dutch Top 40 number-one singles of 1984
List of number-one singles in 1984 (New Zealand)
List of number-one hits in Norway
List of number-one hits (Sweden)
List of number-one hits of 1984 (Switzerland)
List of number-one singles from the 1980s (UK)
List of Hot 100 number-one singles of 1984 (U.S.)
List of number-one R&B singles of 1984 (U.S.)
List of number-one adult contemporary singles of 1984 (U.S.)

References

1984 songs
1984 singles
Stevie Wonder songs
Billboard Hot 100 number-one singles
Cashbox number-one singles
Dutch Top 40 number-one singles
European Hot 100 Singles number-one singles
Irish Singles Chart number-one singles
Number-one singles in Australia
SNEP Top Singles number-one singles
Number-one singles in Germany
Number-one singles in Italy
Number-one singles in New Zealand
Number-one singles in Norway
Number-one singles in South Africa
Number-one singles in Sweden
Number-one singles in Switzerland
Number-one singles in Zimbabwe
RPM Top Singles number-one singles
UK Singles Chart number-one singles
Best Original Song Golden Globe winning songs
Best Original Song Academy Award-winning songs
Songs written by Stevie Wonder
Songs about telephone calls
Motown singles
1980s ballads
Song recordings produced by Stevie Wonder